Chester Matthias Pittser (July 29, 1893 – October 17, 1978) was an American football, basketball, and baseball coach at the college level.  He served as the head football coach at the Montana State School of Mines— then known as Montana Tech of the University of Montana— from 1920 to 1921, Miami University in Oxford, Ohio from 1924 to 1931, and at Montclair State Teachers College—now known as Montclair State University—from 1934 to 1942, compiling a career college football record of 82–45–5.  Pittser was also the head basketball coach at Montclair State from 1934 to 1944, tallying a mark of 123–67, and the head baseball coach at Miami (1925–1931) and Montclair State (1935–1943), amassing a career college baseball record of 129–67–2.

Education and playing career
Pittser graduated from the University of Illinois in 1924 and received his master's degree from Columbia University in 1931.   He was also an all-league fullback and pitcher at Colorado School of Mines.

Coaching career

Miami
Pittser served as football coach for Miami University in Oxford, Ohio from 1924 through 1931 with a record of 41–25–2.  Pittser came to Miami from Montana School of Mines where he coached football and basketball.  While at Miami, he mentored future Pro Football Hall of Fame coaches, Paul Brown and Weeb Ewbank.

Pittser's was the baseball coach during this same period he was football coach.  During his tenure the baseball teams captured three Buckeye Intercollegiate Athletic Association titles and shared two others in compiling a record of 77 wins and 21 losses.  He has the highest winning percentage (.786) of any Miami head coach.  He was inducted into the Miami Athletic Hall of Fame in 1970.

Montclair State
After leaving Miami, he coached football, basketball, and baseball at Montclair State Teachers College in Montclair, New Jersey from 1934 to 1944. In 1934, Pittser became the fourth head football coach in school history and had a career record of 41–20–3.  His best year was his first when he led Montclair to a record of 5–1.  For the season, Pittser's defense only allowed 12 points with the lone loss coming to Trenton State College, 6–0.  Pittser also had a 52–46–2 record as a baseball coach and is a charter member of the Montclair State College Athletic Hall of Fame.

Death
Pittser died on October 17, 1978 in Chula Vista, California at the age of 85.

Head coaching record

College football

References

1893 births
1978 deaths
American men's basketball players
American football fullbacks
Baseball pitchers
Forwards (basketball)
Colorado Mines Orediggers baseball players
Colorado Mines Orediggers men's basketball players
Colorado Mines Orediggers football players
Montana Tech Orediggers football coaches
Montana Tech Orediggers men's basketball coaches
Miami RedHawks baseball coaches
Miami RedHawks football coaches
Montclair State Red Hawks baseball coaches
Montclair State Red Hawks football coaches
Montclair State Red Hawks men's basketball coaches
College men's track and field athletes in the United States
High school football coaches in Colorado
Columbia School of Engineering and Applied Science alumni
University of Illinois Urbana-Champaign alumni
People from Gunnison, Colorado
Coaches of American football from Colorado
Players of American football from Colorado
Baseball players from Colorado
Basketball coaches from Colorado
Basketball players from Colorado